Vaqiri (or Vakiri) is a village in the country of Georgia, in the region of Kakheti, Signagi province.

See also
 Kakheti

Populated places in Kakheti
Tiflis Governorate